The 1932 Winter Olympics, officially known as the III Olympic Winter Games, were a winter multi-sport event held in Lake Placid, New York, United States, from February 4 to February 15, 1932.  A total of 252 athletes representing 17 National Olympic Committees (NOCs) participated in these Games. Overall, 14 events in 7 disciplines were contested.

The Olympic program remained similar to previous Winter Olympics, with only a few exceptions. Both men and women competed in these Games. Warm weather forced officials to hold the four-man bobsleigh competition two days after the closing ceremonies, which had been conducted on February 13.

A total of 87 athletes won medals. Athletes from the United States earned the most medals during the Games, winning 12 medals, half of which were gold. Athletes from Norway and Canada won the second and third most medals, with 10 and 7 respectively. Athletes from 10 participating NOCs won at least one medal; 7 won at least one gold medal.

Sonja Henie of Norway won her second consecutive gold medal in the ladies' individual figure skating competition. Andrée Brunet and Pierre Brunet of France won their third consecutive medal in pairs figure skating, having won bronze in Chamonix before golds in St. Moritz and Lake Placid. In the men's event, Austrian figure skater Karl Schäfer beat out three-time Olympic champion Gillis Grafström of Sweden. American Edward Eagan became the first athlete to win medals at both Summer and Winter Olympics; he had won a gold medal in light heavyweight boxing at the 1920 Summer Olympics and took home a gold in the four-man bobsleigh at Lake Placid. Although other athletes since have earned medals in both Summer and Winter Olympics, Eagan remains the only person to have won gold medals in both.

Bobsleigh

A number of athletes may have served as alternates for the various teams in the bobsleigh events, although there is disagreement among sources as to whether they should be considered medal winners. They are listed in the International Olympic Committee's medalist database as having won medals for teams on which they were alternates. However, while they do appear in the Official Report of the 1932 Olympic Games on pages which list members of the teams, their names are not mentioned in the pages that list winners of the events. This list only includes those athletes who were listed in the Official Report as winners of the events.

Cross-country skiing

Figure skating

Ice hockey

Nordic combined

Ski jumping

Speed skating

Statistics

Multiple medalists
Athletes who won multiple medals during the 1932 Winter Olympics are listed below.

See also
 1932 Winter Olympics medal table

References

External links

1932 Winter
1932 Winter Olympics medal winners

medal winners